Georgios Tzintzis (born 16 July 1993) is a professional footballer who plays for Makedonikos F.C.

Career
Tzintzis began his career with the youth club of Panetolikos F.C. in 2010.  He signed his first professional contract with Panetolikos in August 2012. He made his first-team debut on 18 November 2012, playing against Anagennisi Giannitsa F.C. for the 2012-2013 Greek Football League.

After being released by Panetolikos F.C. in the summer of 2013, he signed with Makedonikos F.C.

References

External links
Profile  at Panetolikos.gr
Profile at myplayer.gr

1993 births
Living people
Greek footballers
Panetolikos F.C. players
Association football defenders